Fabrice Santoro and Nenad Zimonjić were the defending champions. They were both present but did not compete together.
Santoro partnered with Richard Gasquet, but lost in the quarterfinals to Simon Aspelin and Julian Knowle.
Zimonjic partnered with Daniel Nestor, but lost in the semifinals to Martin Damm and Pavel Vízner.

Mahesh Bhupathi and Mark Knowles won in the final 7–5, 7–6(9–7), against Martin Damm and Pavel Vízner.

Seeds

Draw

Draw

External links
 Draw

2008 Dubai Tennis Championships
Dubai Tennis Championships